Arkansas Highway 275 (AR 275) is a state highway in Arkansas that serves Union County. It spans .

Route description
From the south, AR 275 begins as a continuation of LA 549 at the state line. Heading north, AR 275 meets AR 129, and the two are signed together towards Strong. AR 129/275 then meet U.S. Route 82 (US 82) in Strong, with AR 129 ending at the intersection.

AR 275 continues north towards Moro Bay, passing through relatively rural areas. AR 275 ends at an intersection with US 63.

AR 275 is an undivided, two-lane road for its entire route.

Major intersections

See also

References

External links

275
Transportation in Union County, Arkansas